Columbano Bordalo Pinheiro (Almada, 21 November 1857 – Lisbon, 6 November 1929), who is usually referred to as Columbano, was a Portuguese Realist painter. Usually considered the greatest Portuguese painter of the 19th century, he has been compared to the likes of Wilhelm Leibl and John Singer Sargent.

Life and work 
Columbano was the son of romantic painter, Manuel Maria Bordalo Pinheiro, and the younger brother of the great caricaturist, Rafael Bordalo Pinheiro. He became the leading painter of his generation and the master of realism in Portuguese painting, specializing in portraiture. He was disciple of his father, of the painter Miguel Ângelo Lupi and the sculptor Simões de Almeida. After attempting twice for a bursar to study abroad finally in 1881 the Countess of Edla, second wife of King Ferdinand II would finance his study in France. There he studied the work of French naturalist, realist and impressionist painters, like Courbet, Manet and Degas without losing his distinctive style which is often gloomy and intimist.

He joined the "Grupo do Leão" (The Lion's Group), a usual meeting of artists, writers and intellectuals in a Lisbon downtown restaurant called "Leão de Ouro" (The Golden Lion) in order to discuss aesthetic issues and proclaim Naturalism against the academic art of the time. The group also included his brother Rafael Bordalo Pinheiro, Silva Porto, Marques de Oliveira and José Malhoa.

He painted portraits of some of the greatest names of Portuguese society and culture of his time like José Maria de Eça de Queiroz, Teófilo Braga, Raul Brandão and had great psychological accuracy in defining the personality of those depicted.  His most famous portrait was that of the poet Antero de Quental in 1889. In this haunting work Columbano seems to have anticipated Antero's suicide.

Columbano was a well known Republican, so it wasn't surprising that after the Republic proclamation, in 1910, he was invited to design the flag of the new regime and was nominated director of the National Museum of Contemporary Art, currently the Chiado Museum, in Lisbon, of which he was in charge from 1914 to 1927.

The best collection of his paintings is in the Chiado Museum, in Lisbon. He's also represented in some of the finest Portuguese museums, like the National Museum Soares dos Reis, in Porto.

Selected portraits

External links

Columbano Bordalo Pinheiro - at Google Arts & Culture

1857 births
1929 deaths
Realist painters
People from Lisbon
19th-century Portuguese painters
Portuguese male painters
19th-century Portuguese male artists
20th-century Portuguese painters
20th-century Portuguese male artists